The Gârbăul Dejului is a right tributary of the river Someșul Mare in Romania. It discharges into the Someșul Mare in Mănășturel near Dej.

References

Rivers of Romania
Rivers of Cluj County